The yellow-bellied dwarf gecko (Hemiphyllodactylus flaviventris) is a species of gecko. It is endemic to eastern Thailand.

References

Hemiphyllodactylus
Reptiles described in 2018
Endemic fauna of Thailand
Geckos of Thailand